Luke Blake is a professional rugby league footballer who plays for the Batley Bulldogs in the Kingstone Press Championship.

Personal
Luke Blake is the cousin, and former team mate of Leon Walker.

References

External links
Batley Bulldogs profile

1989 births
Living people
Batley Bulldogs players
Dewsbury Rams players
English rugby league players
Place of birth missing (living people)
Rugby league hookers
Wakefield Trinity players